Hemicycla berkeleii is a species of gastropod in the family Helicidae.

It is endemic to Spain.

References

Sources
 Bank, R. A.; Neubert, E. (2017). Checklist of the land and freshwater Gastropoda of Europe. Last update: July 16, 2017

Endemic fauna of the Canary Islands
Molluscs of the Canary Islands
Berkeleii
Endemic fauna of Spain
Gastropods described in 1861
Taxonomy articles created by Polbot